Joe Craig Jr. (born May 6, 1992) is a Canadian football wide receiver for the Canadian Football League (CFL). He went to the University of Memphis in college.

Professional career

Cincinnati Bengals
On May 2, 2015, after going undrafted in the 2015 NFL Draft, Craig signed with the Cincinnati Bengals.

Saskatchewan Roughriders 
On August 16, 2016, Craig signed with the Saskatchewan Roughriders of the Canadian Football League. He recorded two receptions for 32 yards during the 2016 season. He also returned 33 punts for 359 yards, including a 71-yard punt return touchdown versus the Toronto Argonauts on October 15, 2016.

Ahead of the 2017 season, Craig was converted from a wide receiver to a defensive back.

References

External links

1992 births
Living people
American football wide receivers
Canadian football wide receivers
Cincinnati Bengals players
Saskatchewan Roughriders players
American players of Canadian football
Clemson Tigers football players
Memphis Tigers football players
Copiah-Lincoln Wolfpack football players